(officially capitalised as SUPER NINTENDO WORLD) is a themed area at Universal Studios Japan and Universal Studios Hollywood and under construction at Universal Studios Singapore and the upcoming Universal's Epic Universe at Universal Orlando Resort. A result of a partnership between Nintendo and Universal Destinations & Experiences, the area is based on Nintendo video game franchises, primarily the Mario franchise and its various sub-series.

A creative partnership between Nintendo and Universal was first announced in May 2015, with construction of a dedicated Nintendo-themed area confirmed for Universal Studios Japan and both American locations the following year. Construction began on the Universal Studios Japan area in June 2017. Following several delays due to the COVID-19 pandemic the land had its grand opening at Universal Studios Japan on March 18, 2021. The Universal Studios Hollywood location held its grand opening on February 17, 2023. Mario creator Shigeru Miyamoto was heavily involved in the design and construction of the land and its attractions.

History 
Following several years of declining gaming revenue and console market share, Nintendo sought avenues to leverage and develop its intellectual properties, entering into a theme park partnership with Universal Parks & Resorts. The partnership, announced in May 2015 and detailed the next year, would use Mario and other Nintendo franchises as themes in the dedicated areas of Universal theme parks. The billion ($351million U.S.) collaboration built for Universal Studios Japan in Osaka is similar in scale to Universal's investment in the Harry Potter franchise. An interview video that previewed objects being constructed for the land was uploaded on November 29, 2016. The first concept image of Japan's iteration of the area was then unveiled on December 12, 2016.

Construction on the land at Universal Studios Japan began in June 2017 with a groundbreaking ceremony. Following months of leaked information and patents, photographs of Universal Creative's scale model for the Japan iteration of the area were leaked on July 8, 2019. On January 13, 2020, Universal unveiled the interactive Power-Up Bands and released a music video on YouTube for the upcoming land, using the song "We Are Born to Play" by Galantis ft. Charli XCX. The land's opening was initially planned for completion before the 2020 Summer Olympics, but was delayed due to the COVID-19 pandemic. On December 18, 2020, a Nintendo Direct about the land went live on Nintendo's official YouTube channel, featuring Mario creator Shigeru Miyamoto hosting a tour around a small fraction of the land. On December 26, 2020, the land soft-opened to limited previews for Universal Studios Japan annual passholders.

On November 30, 2020, Universal officially announced that the land would open at Universal Studios Japan on February 4, 2021; however, in January the opening was once again delayed indefinitely after the Japanese government reimposed a state of emergency in response to a third wave of COVID-19 infections in the city. However, guests with a Universal Studios Japan annual pass are allowed to visit the area as of February 4, 2021. It eventually opened to the public on March 18, 2021. A month after opening, the entirety of Universal Studios Japan closed from April 25 to June 7 of 2021, due to COVID-19.

In November 2016, Universal announced that Super Nintendo World areas would also be built at both American Universal locations in Hollywood and Florida. Construction on the land at Universal Studios Hollywood began in 2019. On March 10, 2022, the park announced that its version of the land would open in 2023. On December 14, 2022, Universal officially announced that the land would open in Hollywood on February 17, 2023. The area soft-opened under technical rehearsals for reserved-guests on January 12, 2023, and officially opened as planned on February 17, 2023, about a month and a half before the release of Universal's The Super Mario Bros. Movie.

Design

Universal Studios Japan 
At Universal Studios Japan, Super Nintendo World is wedged in at the northern end of the park, west of The Wizarding World of Harry Potter and south of the Nintendo headquarters that are just outside of the property. Guests enter the area through a Warp Pipe from an entrance plaza. The entrance plaza can be accessed from a walkway that branches right next to the WaterWorld sign. The entrance plaza has lamp posts, a power star in the pavement, and Super Nintendo World signage next to the pipe. The pipe leads into Princess Peach's Castle. When guests exit the castle, they enter the courtyard on the 2nd floor, immersed in the Mushroom Kingdom with Bowser's Castle across the area. Several Pikmin can be found across the land on ledges, with some carrying objects like coins and a berry. The area includes tower viewer binoculars based on Super Mario 3D Land that utilize AR technology, and include a cameo of Rosalina and her Comet Observatory.

Guests can use the separately sold Power-Up Bands and the official Universal Studios smartphone application to keep track of their character stamps, Key Challenges, coins collected, and their high-score on Mario Kart: Koopa's Challenge. Team, individual, and daily scores for the area are viewable within the app as well. The Power-Up Bands also function as Amiibo for their respective characters within Amiibo-compatible video games.

Several costume character meet-and-greets are located throughout the area. Princess Peach is stationed inside a gazebo-like structure next to her castle, while Mario and Luigi are near the entrance to the Yoshi's Adventure attraction. Toad has no set meet-and-greet spot, with guests being able to visit him in different parts of the lower-level.

On September 28, 2021, an expansion themed after the Donkey Kong series was announced to open in 2024, featuring a roller coaster, interactive experiences, and themed merchandise and food. From November 11, 2022 to January 6, 2023, the area was decorated in festive winter-themed decorations, as part of the "No Limit! Christmas Event!"

Universal Studios Hollywood 

Universal Studios Hollywood's smaller Super Nintendo World area is located in the park's Lower Lot, wedged between the Jurassic World area and Transformers: The Ride. Due to the Lower Lot having severely limited available space, Universal demolished and relocated soundstages to make room for the land's construction.

The area's soft-opening in January 2023 revealed what this condensed iteration of the land had to exclude. This location lacks a Toad meet-and-greet, the interactive "Bob-Omb Kaboom Room", "Note Block Rock", and "Slot Machine" sections, and the Yoshi's Adventure attraction. While this version lacks the attraction, the extended-queue for Mario Kart: Bowser's Challenge features Yoshi's Adventure-themed corridors.

Future locations 
On April 3, 2019, it was announced that Super Nintendo World would be brought to Universal Studios Singapore, replacing the park's Madagascar area. Construction there began in 2020, and is expected to be complete by 2025. It is currently unknown if Singapore's iteration of the land will be similar to Japan's version or Hollywood's version or a completely new version.

On January 24, 2020, Universal confirmed that a Super Nintendo World themed area would be included in the upcoming Universal's Epic Universe park at Universal Orlando Resort. A Comcast executive reaffirmed it one week later. The park was originally scheduled to open in 2023, but the planned opening has been delayed to mid-2025 as a result of the COVID-19 pandemic.

Attractions

Universal Studios Japan

Universal Studios Hollywood

Notes

References

External links 
 Universal Studios Japan: Super Nintendo World
 Universal Studios Hollywood: Super Nintendo World

2021 establishments in Japan
Universal Studios Japan
Universal Studios Hollywood
Universal Orlando
Universal Studios Singapore
Nintendo
Nintendo
2023 establishments in California